Beat Butchers is a Swedish record label mostly dealing in punk, especially trallpunk. They started in 1991, but had earlier published music under the name Studio otukt records.

Signed bands
23 Till
Alarmrock
Asta Kask
Brandgul
Coca Carola
Hans & Greta
Inferno
Krapotkin
Krymplings
Köttgrottorna
Nittonhundratalsräven
Ohlson Har Semester Production
Parkinsons
Per Bertil Birgers Orkester
Radioaktiva Räker
Roger Karlsson
Rolands Gosskör
Sista Skriket
Slutstation Tjernobyl
Solar Lodge
Svart Snö
Varnagel
Åka Bil

References

External links
Beat Butchers

Swedish record labels
Punk record labels